Cardiel is a skate punk band under the influence of stoner, the psychedelia and dub.

History 
Natives of Valencia, Venezuela, Cardiel formed in Mexico City in the middle of 2010 by Samantha Ambrosio (drums/vocals) and Miguel Fraino (guitar/vocals). The idea behind the band was to make music for skateboarding videos, achieving the combination between the fast and aggressive to a psychedelic dub. 
The band has gained notoriety among the skate sub-culture. and has been featured by Thrasher magazine. 

They have played at important events for the skate community in Mexico, like the 30 years of the Thrasher Magazine party in Mexico, Skate Rock concert tours with Thrasher magazine in Mexico, and the 50 year event of House of Vans in Mexico City. 

In 2015 and 2017, they played at the SXSW festival. They have also played at the Festival Palafoxiano, the Doomed and Stoned Festival Latin America and have been featured on media music shows and throughout Latin America, including Vice Media, Univision and Canal Once (Mexico).

References

Skate punk groups
Musical groups from Mexico City
People from Valencia, Venezuela
Venezuelan musical groups
2010 establishments in Mexico
Musical groups established in 2010